Essam Abo Touk (born September 19, 1977) is a retired Jordanian footballer. He is currently the coach for American University of Sharjah football team.

International goals

External links
 
 

1977 births
Living people
Jordanian footballers
Shabab Al-Ordon Club players
Al-Baqa'a Club players
Association football midfielders
Jordan international footballers
Jordanian Pro League players